Zhang Jieqing (12 October 1912—27 May 2015) was a Chinese politician and writer, as well as a member of the Communist Party of China. In 1933, Zhang Jieqing was arrested by the Kuomintang, spending several months in jail. After that she graduated from Beijing Normal University. During the Cultural Revolution, she suffered political persecution and was put in prison for seven years. She was the wife of Peng Zhen.  Zhang died of illness on 27 May 2015 at the age of 102.

References

1912 births
2015 deaths
Chinese Communist Party politicians from Hebei
People's Republic of China politicians from Hebei
Beijing Normal University alumni
Chinese centenarians
Politicians from Langfang
Victims of the Cultural Revolution
Women centenarians